James Lee Cleveland (born March 7, 1988) is an American football wide receiver who is currently a free agent.

College career
Cleveland continued his football career after high school at Iowa. After one season at Iowa, Cleveland was dismissed after he was found with drugs in his dorm room. After his dismissal, Cleveland attended Trinity Valley Community College where he played football. Upon graduation from Trinity Valley, Cleveland accepted a scholarship offer to play at Houston. Cleveland ranked second in the nation for receptions per game, and sixth in receiving yards per game for the 2009 season. He was named the 2009 Conference USA Newcomer of the Year.

Professional career

Dallas Cowboys
Cleveland was not selected in the 2011 NFL Draft and signed with the Dallas Cowboys as an undrafted free agent on August 1, 2011. He was cut on August 23, 2011.

New Mexico Stars
Cleveland played with the New Mexico Stars of the Lone Star Football League (LSFL) in 2014.

Duke City Gladiators
After the Stars folded just prior to the start of the 2015 season, Cleveland signed with the Duke City Gladiators of Champions Indoor Football (CIF). He re-signed with the Gladiators on October 10, 2015. He was released on March 7, 2016.

See also
2009 Houston Cougars football team
2010 Houston Cougars football team

References

External links
Houston Cougars profile
Rivals profile

1988 births
Living people
People from Baytown, Texas
American football wide receivers
Iowa Hawkeyes football players
Trinity Valley Cardinals football players
Houston Cougars football players
Dallas Cowboys players
New Mexico Stars players
Duke City Gladiators players
Sportspeople from Harris County, Texas